An endorheic lake (also called a sink lake or terminal lake) is a collection of water within an endorheic basin, or sink, with no evident outlet. Endorheic lakes are generally saline as a result of being unable to get rid of solutes left in the lake by evaporation. These lakes can be used as indicators of anthropogenic change, such as irrigation or climate change, in the areas surrounding them. Lakes with subsurface drainage are considered cryptorheic.

Components of endorheic lakes 
The two main ways that endorheic lakes accumulate water are through river flow into the lake (discharge) and precipitation falling into the lake. The collected water of the lake, instead of discharging, can only be lost due to either evapotranspiration or percolation (water sinking underground, e.g., to become groundwater in an aquifer). Because of this lack of an outlet, endorheic lakes are mostly salt water rather than fresh water. The salinity in the lake gradually builds up through years as water evaporates and leaves its solutes behind.

Similar types of lakes 
Depending on water losses, precipitation, and inflow (e.g., a spring, a tributary, or flooding), the temporal result of a lake in a sink may change. The lake could be a persistent lake, an intermittent lake, a playa lake (temporarily covered with water), or an ephemeral lake, which completely disappears (e. g. by evaporation) before reappearing in wetter seasons. These terms (playa, ephemeral lake, etc.) are sometimes used interchangeably, but there has been activity tending towards defining meanings for each term. This change would mean less confusion over the designations of different types of endorheic lakes.

Anthropogenic effects 
Many endorheic lakes exist in arid or semi-arid climates. Because these climates have limited rainfall, but also a high possibility of evaporation, endorheic lakes in these regions often experience flux in their water levels. This flux can be aggravated by anthropogenic intrusions (e.g. global warming).

In Central Asia, a large percentage of water for farming comes from surface water, like endorheic lakes, rather than precipitation. Because of the overall lack of precipitation, farming in this area can only be sustained by irrigation. Massive amounts of irrigation in agrarian Central Asia have led to the reduction in size of endorheic lakes. The Aral Sea was once the second largest endorheic lake in the world, but anthropogenic effects such as bad irrigation practices have led to this lake's drastic decrease in size and turn into a desert named the Aralkum Desert.

Endorheic lakes, because of the closed nature of their systems, are sensitive to new conditions. Records of previous environmental change are preserved in lake sediments in endorheic lakes that are being affected by climate change; these natural records can give information about past climates and conditions of the lake. Research on these lake sediments could lead to these lakes becoming archives of the effects of climate change. There is early evidence that in regions affected by irrigation the majority of endorheic lake area may have already been lost.

List of endorheic lakes

Africa 
 Afar Depression, Great Rift Valley in East Africa
Lake Chad in Central Africa

Asia 
 Aral Sea, Kazakhstan, Uzbekistan
 Caspian Sea, Iran, Azerbaijan, Russia, Kazakhstan, Turkmenistan
 Dead Sea, Israel, Jordan, West Bank
 Gavkhouni, Isfahan, Iran
 Hamun-e Jaz Murian, Kerman and Sistan and Baluchistan, Iran
 Hamun Lake, Iran
 Lake Urmia, West Azerbaijan Province, Iran
 Lake Van, Turkey
 Maharloo Lake, Fars Province, Iran
 Namak Lake, Qom, Iran
 Qarhan Playa, Qinghai, China

Australia 
 Lake Eyre, South Australia
 Lake George, New South Wales

North America 
 Carson Sink, Churchill County, Nevada, U.S.
 Devil's Lake, Wisconsin, U.S.
 Lake Enriquillo, Dominican Republic
 Etang Saumâtre, Haiti
 Great Salt Lake, Utah, U.S.
 Humboldt Sink, northwestern Nevada, U.S.
 Pyramid Lake, western Nevada, U.S.
 Quinn River Sink, northwestern Nevada, U.S.
 Salton Sink, southern California, U.S.
 Eagle Lake, British Columbia, Canada
 Choelquoit Lake, British Columbia, Canada
 Martin Lake, British Columbia, Canada

See also

References

Endorheic basins
Depressions (geology)
Hydrology
Geography terminology